Chumpitaz is a surname. Notable people with the surname include:

Héctor Chumpitaz, Peruvian football player
Iván Chumpitaz, Peruvian football player
Javier Chumpitaz, Peruvian football player
Raquel Chumpitaz, Peruvian volleyball player

Quechuan-language surnames